Kung Fu Divas is a 2013 Philippine action comedy film directed by Onat Diaz and starring Ai Ai delas Alas and Marian Rivera. The lead stars also co-produced the film which opened in theaters on October 2, 2013, as part of Star Cinema's 20th Anniversary presentation.

This film is a  parody of Gu Long's Wuxia novel Juedai Shuangjiao.

Plot 
Charlotte (Ai Ai de las Alas) is from a family of beauty queens, but she has yet to win a title of her own. Her final chance is the Hiyas ng Dalampasigan Pageant (literally, Seaside Jewel Pageant), and her mother has taken steps to make sure that she wins. But her chances are dashed when the mysterious Samantha (Marian Rivera) suddenly joins the contest. The two become bitter enemies following the contest, but they are soon forced by destiny to team up. It turns out the two have a hidden connection to a mystical past, and must work together to discover the truth about their heritage.

Cast 
Ai Ai delas Alas as Charlotte/Lyna (xiao yu'er?)
Marian Rivera as Samantha/Mena (hua wu que?)
Roderick Paulate
Gloria Diaz as Charlotte's Adoptive Mother
Edward Mendez as Kojic/Kojic's Father
Nova Villa
Ruffa Gutierrez
Martin Escudero
Roy Alvarez† as Charlotte's Adoptive Father
Precious Lara Quigaman
Bianca Manalo
German Moreno† as Hiyas ng Dalampasigan Host (Cameo)
Vicki Belo as a fictional version of herself (Cameo)
Cacai Bautista as Samantha's original face (Cameo)

Reception 
Duane Lucas Pascua of Spot.ph (a publication of Summit Media) both gave praise to the film and its director, saying: "One of the key strengths of the film is how it pokes fun into the varied facets of modern Filipino culture while managing to stay away from being preachy." Nestor U. Torre of Philippine Daily Inquirer said the film is "visually vivid, doesn't scrimp on production values, and elicit perky performances from its actors," while also pointed out that it "fails to come off as a complete treat, due to deficiencies in its storytelling, and what eventually turns out to be its too varied mix of disparate elements, which fail to harmoniously fuse together by the film’s final fade."

International Film Festivals
FANTASPORTO  2014-34th Oporto International Film Festival
Official Selection - Orient Express Section
14th Neuchatel International Fantastic Film Festival
Official Selection - New Cinema From Asia
Feratum 2014, Mexico
Exhibition Film

Awards
62nd FAMAS Awards 2014
Best Special Effects - Winner
Best Actress: Marian Rivera - Nominated
Best Cinematography - Nominated
Best Production Design - Nominated
Best Visual Effects - Nominated

References

External links

2013 direct-to-video films
Star Cinema films
Films based on works by Gu Long
2010s martial arts comedy films
Philippine martial arts comedy films
Kung fu films
Philippine kung fu films
2013 martial arts films
2013 films